School Master may refer to:

Schoolmaster, a male graduate teacher 
School Master (1943 film), a Hindi film directed by Chimanlal Luhar and starring Karan Dewan and Gope 
School Master (1958 film), a Kannada film directed by B. R. Panthulu and starring Dikki Madhav Rao and Udaykumar
School Master (1959 film), a Hindi film directed by B. R. Panthulu and starring Karan Dewan and Shakila
School Master (1964 film), a Malayalam film directed by S. R. Puttanna and starring Prem Nazir and K. Balaji
School Master (1973 film), a Tamil film directed by B. R. Panthulu and starring Gemini Ganesan and Sowcar Janaki
School Master (1985 film), an Oriya film directed by Gobind Tej and starring Gobind Tej and Uttam Mohanty
School Master (2010 film), a Kannada film directed by Dinesh Babu and starring Vishnuvardhan and Suhasini